The Holy Trinity Column in Olomouc, in the Czech Republic is a Baroque monument (Trinity column) that was built between 1716 and 1754. The main purpose was to celebrate the Catholic Church and faith, partly caused by feeling of gratitude for ending a plague, which struck Moravia (now in the Czech Republic) between 1713 and 1715. The column was also understood to be an expression of local patriotism, since all artists and master craftsmen working on this monument were Olomouc citizens, and almost all depicted saints were connected with the city of Olomouc in some way.

It is the biggest Baroque sculptural group in the Czech Republic. In 2000 it was inscribed on the UNESCO World Heritage List as "one of the most exceptional examples of the apogee of central European Baroque artistic expression".

History

According to the ICOMOS evaluation of this patrimony, "the erection of Marian (plague) columns on town squares is an exclusively Baroque, post-Tridentine, phenomenon. Its iconographic basis lies in the Book of Revelation.  The basic model is thought to have been the column in the Piazza Santa Maria Maggiore in Rome, from 1614.

This monument for Olomouc was the culmination of work of several artists and master craftsmen, but it did not bring much fortune to them. The first to die during the work was Wenzel Render, a monumental mason and privileged imperial architect. He came first with the idea to build the column, enforced his will upon the city council, designed it, built the first stage and helped to finance it. His followers Franz Thoneck, Johann Wenzel Rokický and Augustin Scholtz also did not live long enough to see the column finished; it was completed by Johann Ignaz Rokický. The sculptural decoration was started by Phillip Sattler.  After his death Andreas Zahner continued and made 18 sculptures and 9 reliefs in 7 years before he died as well. Goldsmith Simon Forstner, who made gilded copper sculptures of the Holy Trinity and of the Assumption of the Virgin, was somewhat luckier and managed to finish his brilliant work. However he lost his health when working on the sculptures and using toxic mercury compounds during the gilding process.

After the Holy Trinity Column was finished in 1754, it became a source of great pride for Olomouc, since all people participating in its creation were citizens of the town. The column was consecrated in a great celebration attended by Empress Maria Theresa and her husband Francis I.

Only four years later, when Olomouc was besieged by a Prussian army and the Holy Trinity Column was hit by shots from Prussian cannons several times, Olomouc citizens went in a procession to beg the Prussian general not to shoot at the monument. General James Keith complied with their wishes. The column was repaired soon after the war and a replica of a stone shot was half-buried in its stem on the place where it was hit to remind people of this event.

Description

The column is dominated by gilded copper sculptures of the Holy Trinity accompanied by the Archangel Gabriel on the top and the Assumption of the Virgin beneath it.

The base of the column, in three levels, is surrounded by 18 more stone sculptures of saints and 14 reliefs in elaborate cartouches. At the uppermost stage are saints connected with Jesus’ earth life – his mother's parents St. Anne and St. Joachim, his foster-father St. Joseph, and St. John the Baptist, who was preparing his coming – who are accompanied by St. Lawrence and St. Jerome, saints to whom the chapel in the Olomouc town hall was dedicated. Three reliefs represent the Three theological virtues Faith, Hope, and Love.

Below them, the second stage is dedicated to Moravian saints St. Cyril and St. Methodius (Czech Metoděj), who came to Great Moravia to spread Christianity in 863 (St. Methodius became Moravian Archbishop), St. Blaise, in whose name one of the main Olomouc churches is consecrated, and patrons of neighbouring Bohemia St. Adalbert of Prague (Czech Vojtěch) and St. John of Nepomuk (Czech Jan Nepomucký), whose following was very strong there as well.

In the lowest stage one can see the figures of an Austrian patron St. Maurice and a Bohemian patron St. Wenceslas (Czech Václav), in whose names two important Olomouc churches were consecrated, another Austrian patron St. Florian, who was also viewed as a protector against various disasters, especially fire, St. John of Capistrano (Czech Jan Kapistránský), who used to preach in Olomouc, St. Anthony of Padua, a member of the Franciscan Order, which owned an important monastery in Olomouc, and St. Aloysius Gonzaga, a patron of students. His sculpture showed that Olomouc was very proud of its university.

Reliefs of all twelve apostles are placed among these sculptures.

John Sarkander

The last missing in this list of saints is St. John Sarkander (Czech Jan Sarkander), whose statue (holding a lily as a symbol of purity) is on the second stage. John Sarkander was a priest who was tortured to death in Olomouc prison in the beginning of the Thirty Years' War, because he, as the legend says, refused to break the seal of confession. The decision to place him here violated the tradition, since Sarkander had not been canonized and not even beatified in that time yet, which could have resulted in problems with the Holy See. However, his following was so strong here that the craftsmen decided to take the risk. Sarkander was beatified in 1859 and canonized in 1995 on the occasion of the visit of Pope John Paul II in Olomouc.

Inner chapel

The column also houses a small chapel inside with reliefs depicting Cain's offering from his crop, Abel's offering of firstlings of his flock, Noah's first burnt offering after the Flood, Abraham's offering of Isaac and of a lamb, and Jesus' death. The cities of Jerusalem and Olomouc can be seen in the background of the last mentioned relief.

See also
1754 in architecture
Marian and Holy Trinity columns
Pestsäule, Vienna

References

Bibliography
Books in Czech:
 Perůtka, Marek (ed.) (2001). Sloup Nejsvětější Trojice v Olomouci. Olomouc: Statutární město Olomouc. (includes English summary)
 Los, Petr & Brabcová, Jitka (2002). Svatí na sloupu Nejsvětější Trojice v Olomouci. Olomouc: Danal. 
 Tichák, Milan (2002). Příběhy olomouckých pomníků. Olomouc: Burian a Tichák, s. r. o.

External links

 UNESCO World Heritage Site: Holy Trinity Column
 Holy Trinity Column – history and regeneration
 Holy Trinity Column – Olomouc official website
 Holy Trinity Column – touristic information

National Cultural Monuments of the Czech Republic
Buildings and structures in Olomouc
Catholic sculpture
World Heritage Sites in the Czech Republic
Religious buildings and structures completed in 1754
Baroque church buildings in the Czech Republic
Marian and Holy Trinity columns
Tourist attractions in the Olomouc Region
1754 establishments in Europe